The Girl with the Five Zeros (German: Das Mädchen mit den fünf Nullen) is a 1927 German silent comedy film directed by Curtis Bernhardt. It was shot at the Grunewald Studios in Berlin. The film's sets were designed by Heinrich Richter. The plot concerns a winning lottery ticket.

Cast
  as Arnold Lebbecke  
  as Lola Lutz  
 Paul Bildt as Günther Wahnheim  
 Veit Harlan as Ernst Waldt, Maler  
 Elsa Wagner as Lebbeckes Frau  
 Adele Sandrock as Wahnheims Mutter  
 Heinz Rühmann 
 Jack Trevor as Hochstapler 
 Arthur Kraußneck 
 Eberhard Leithoff as Bräutigam  
 
 Elza Temary as Wahnheims Tochter  
 Bruno Ziener as Müller, Lotteriekollekteur

References

Bibliography
 Bock, Hans-Michael & Bergfelder, Tim. The Concise Cinegraph: Encyclopaedia of German Cinema. Berghahn Books, 2009.

External links

1927 films
Films of the Weimar Republic
German silent feature films
Films directed by Curtis Bernhardt
1927 comedy films
German comedy films
German black-and-white films
Silent comedy films
1920s German films
1920s German-language films